This is a list of notable Jewish American photographers. For other Jewish Americans, see Lists of Jewish Americans.

 Bob Adelman
 Dianna Agron
 Merry Alpern
 Diane Arbus
 Eve Arnold
 Ellen Auerbach
 Richard Avedon
 Lillian Bassman
 Erwin Blumenfeld
 Lynne Cohen
 Ted Croner
 Bruce Davidson
 Alfred Eisenstaedt
 Louis Faurer
 Nat Fein
 Barry Feinstein
 Trude Fleischmann
 Robert Frank
 Leonard Freed
 Nan Goldin
 Milton H. Greene
 Lauren Greenfield
 Sid Grossman
 Philippe Halsman
 Don Hunstein
 Lotte Jacobi
 William Klein
 Max Kozloff
 Gillian Laub
 Alma Lavenson
 Annie Leibovitz
 Saul Leiter
 Leon Levinstein
 Helen Levitt
 Danny Lyon
 Linda McCartney
 Mary Ellen Mark
 Jeff Mermelstein
 Joel Meyerowitz
 Lisette Model
 Carl Mydans
 Arnold Newman
 Helmut Newton
 Arthur Ollman
 Ruth Orkin
 Man Ray
 Joe Rosenthal
 Arthur Rothstein
 Steve Schapiro
 Jerry Schatzberg
 Paul Schutzer
 David Seymour
 Ben Shahn
 Art Shay
 Cindy Sherman
 Stephen Shore
 Julius Shulman
 Aaron Siskind
 Rosalind Fox Solomon
 Phil Stern
 Marcel Sternberger
 Joel Sternfeld
 Alfred Stieglitz
 Ezra Stoller
 Lou Stoumen
 Paul Strand
 Stanley Tretick
 Doris Ulmann
 Weegee
 Dan Weiner
 Garry Winogrand
 Penny Wolin

Footnotes

Jewish
Photographers
Jewish Americans